Willem "Wim" Kok (29 September 1938 – 20 October 2018) was a Dutch politician and trade union leader who served as Prime Minister of the Netherlands from 22 August 1994 until 22 July 2002. He was a member of the Labour Party (PvdA).

Kok studied business administration at the Nyenrode Business School obtaining a Bachelor of Business Administration degree and worked as a trade union leader for the Trade Unions Association from 1961 until 1976 and serving as chairman from 1972. In 1976 it merged to form the Federation of Dutch Trade Unions, with Kok serving as its first chairman until 1986. After the election of 1986, Kok was elected as a Member of the House of Representatives, taking office on 3 June 1986. Shortly after the election incumbent Leader Joop den Uyl announced he was stepping down and endorsed Kok as his successor taking office on 21 July 1986. For the election of 1989, Kok served as Lijsttrekker (top candidate) and made a coalition accord with incumbent Prime Minister Ruud Lubbers of the Christian Democratic Appeal (CDA) which formed the Cabinet Lubbers III and became deputy prime minister and minister of finance taking office on 7 November 1989.

For the election of 1994, Kok again served as Lijsttrekker and following a cabinet formation, formed the Cabinet Kok I and became Prime Minister of the Netherlands taking office on 22 August 1994. For the election of 1998 Kok once more served as Lijsttrekker and after another successful cabinet formation, formed the Cabinet Kok II and continued as prime minister for a second term. In December 2001, Kok announced he was stepping down as Leader and that he would not stand for the election of 2002 or serve another term as prime minister. Kok left office following the installation of the Cabinet Balkenende I on 22 July 2002.

Kok retired from active politics at 63 and became active in the private and public sectors as a corporate and non-profit director, served on several  and councils on behalf of the government, and continued to be active as a lobbyist for the European Union, advocating for more European integration. Kok was known for his abilities as a manager and negotiator. During his premiership, his cabinets were responsible for several major social reforms legalizing same-sex marriage, euthanasia and further reducing the deficit. Kok was granted the honorary title of Minister of State on 11 April 2003 and continued to comment on political affairs as a statesman until his death at the age of 80. He holds the distinction of leading the first purple coalitions as Prime Minister and is consistently ranked both by scholars and the public as one of the best prime ministers after World War II.

Early life
Willem Kok was born on 29 September 1938, in Bergambacht in the Netherlands Province of South Holland, the son of Willem Kok (29 March 1910 – 10 January 1981) a carpenter, and Neeltje de Jager (17 October 1913 – 5 May 2005). He was a Calvinist and had one younger brother who was born in 1945.

After completing his studies in business at the Nyenrode Business Universiteit, he started his career in 1961 at the socialist Netherlands Association of Trade Unions (NVV), where he was chairman from 1973 until 1982. In 1982, the NVV merged with Nederlands Katholiek Vakverbond (NKV), the Catholic trade union, to form the Federatie Nederlandse Vakbeweging (FNV), of which he served as chair until 1986.

Political career

Parliamentary leader and Minister of Finance

Kok was elected as a Member of the House of Representatives on 3 June 1986, after the Dutch general election of 1986. Soon after the election Joop den Uyl the Leader of the Labour Party and Parliamentary leader of the Labour Party in the House of Representatives announced that he was stepping down after serving twenty years as Leader of the Labour Party. Kok was elected to succeed him and became Party and Parliamentary leader of the Labour Party in the House of Representatives on 21 July 1986 and served as Opposition leader during the parliamentary period of the Cabinet Lubbers II.

Kok lead his party in the Dutch general election of 1989. The Labour Party lost three seats but the following cabinet formation resulted in a coalition agreement with the Christian Democratic Appeal (CDA) which formed the Cabinet Lubbers III. Kok entered government for the first time and became both Deputy Prime Minister of the Netherlands and Minister of Finance, serving from 7 November 1989 until 22 August 1994.

Prime Minister of the Netherlands

First term (1994–1998) 
In the 1994 general election, the Labour Party lost twelve seats but the CDA with new leader Elco Brinkman lost twenty seats. The Labour Party became the largest party in the House of Representatives, after an arduous cabinet formation with the conservative liberal People's Party for Freedom and Democracy (VVD) and the social liberal Democrats 66 (D66) a deal was struck that resulted in the Cabinet Kok I, with Kok as prime minister. It was considered groundbreaking in Dutch politics this was the first Cabinet of the Netherlands since 1908 without a Christian democratic party.

The main aim of the Cabinet Kok I was to create employment. The Dutch economy had been in a deep recession for years. The market was allowed more influence in the economy. This led to a policy of tax reduction, economizing, and trying to keep people out of social care by supporting employment; large infrastructure projects were set in motion. Another aim was to put an end to the enormous debt of the Dutch government. The Treaty of Amsterdam was signed during this cabinet. The Srebrenica massacre occurred under the responsibility of this government, which eventually led to the fall of the second Kok cabinet.

In the 1998 general election, the Labour party gained eight seats; the coalition retained its majority, and cabinet formation resulted in a continuation of policies with the Cabinet Kok II.

Second term (1998–2002) 
The second cabinet was the successor of the first cabinet was formed from the same coalition of PvdA, VVD and D66. It was also known as the "second purple cabinet" called such because it contained both the social-democratic PvdA (red) and the liberal VVD (blue). The aim of the cabinet was to continue the policy of cabinet Kok I, which was concerned with economizing, tax reduction, and making an end to unemployment. Kok was the prime minister, Annemarie Jorritsma as the deputy prime minister for the VVD, and Els Borst for D66. The cabinet had both left-wing and right-wing political parties as a part of it. There was no strong opposition in the House of Representatives. This did not mean that Kok did not face any problems. In May 1999, D66 stepped out of the coalition when proposed legislation on referendums, entered by this party, was blocked; through negotiations the crisis was solved and the cabinet stayed together. Moreover, allegations of expenses abuse were made against Minister of the Interior and Kingdom Relations Bram Peper from the time he was mayor of Rotterdam. On 13 March 2000 Peper resigned as minister, according to himself to no longer bring problems to the public government, and to be better able to defend himself. On the other hand, Kok's second term is known for legalizing same-sex marriage and euthanasia. A number of other reforms were also realised. In January 1999 the Flexibility and Security Act took effect, which made “fixed employment more flexible and increased the security of flexible employees.” On 1 November 1999, a new law on working conditions took effect, which created scope “for a more prominent role of works councils in the field of working conditions.” 
The Adaptation of Working Hours Act gave employees “the right to request the shortening or lengthening of their working hours.” One of the aims of the law was to promote the combination of work and care duties for both men and women. On 1 January 2002 a new Work and Care Act came into force. This legislation brought together various existing and new leave provisions and sought to facilitate the reconciliation of work and family responsibilities.In addition to the amendment of existing regulations, such as those governing maternity and parental leave, new provisions covered the right to adjust working hours if personal circumstances require; two days of paid paternity leave; four weeks' leave for couples who adopt a child; and two days of paid leave per year for urgent personal reasons, along with 10 days of paid leave a year to care for family members.

On 15 December 2001, Kok announced he would retire from national politics after the elections of May 2002. He stood down as Leader of the Labour Party that same day, in favour of Ad Melkert. Unfortunately, Melkert did not appeal to the voter. Moreover, the "polder model" went out of fashion in early 2002, which saw the rise of Pim Fortuyn, a political newcomer.

On 16 April 2002, close to the natural end of term for the cabinet, prime minister Kok wished to resign early after being harshly criticised in a government-commissioned report by the NIOD Institute for War, Holocaust and Genocide Studies regarding the fall of Srebrenica in 1995 and the other ministers had no choice but to follow him. The second Kok cabinet remained in place as a caretaker cabinet, which had to cope with the murder of Fortuyn, and the CDA with leader Jan Peter Balkenende winning the elections. The caretaker cabinet stepped down on 22 July 2002, when the Cabinet Balkenende I was installed.

Legacy
Kok was highly praised for his Third Way and polder model philosophies and for the success of leading his Purple Coalitions. During his premiership, his cabinets were responsible for implementing several social reforms, legalizing same-sex marriage and euthanasia, stimulating the economy resulting in more employment and privatization and further reducing the deficit. As a result of this, and because of his skills as manager and negotiator, Kok was praised by his fellow European leaders.

After politics
After his premiership, Kok retired from active politics at the age of sixty-three and became a lobbyist for the European Union and presided over several "high-level groups". He also occupied numerous seats on supervisory boards in the business and industry world (ING Group, Koninklijke TNT Post, Royal Dutch Shell, KLM, Stork B.V., International Commission on Missing Persons, International Crisis Group, Anne Frank Foundation and served as president of the Club of Madrid from 2009 until December 2013). On 11 April 2003, he was granted the honorary title of Minister of State.

Lisbon Strategy
Between April and November 2004, Kok headed up a review of the Lisbon Strategy and presented a report containing suggestions on how to give new impetus to the Lisbon process. The European Commission used this report to declare that the social and environmental parts are no longer a priority and declared a return to the Lisbon Agenda under economic terms only. Kok lobbied for the Lisbon Strategy of the European Commission and was appointed to the Honorary Board of the European Association of History Educators.

Between 2006 and 2007, Kok served as member of the Amato Group, a group of high-level European politicians unofficially working on rewriting the Treaty establishing a Constitution for Europe into what became known as the Treaty of Lisbon following its rejection by French and Dutch voters.

Personal
In 1965, after four years of dating, Kok married Margrietha Lummechiena "Rita" Roukema (born 3 November 1939). He adopted her two children from a previous marriage, daughter Carla (born 1959) and son André (born 1961 and died March 30, 2022), who was mentally disabled, and together they had a third child, son Marcel (born 1966).

Death
Kok died on 20 October 2018 in Amsterdam, aged 80.

Decorations

Honorary degrees

References

External links

Official
  W. (Wim) Kok Parlement & Politiek
  Kabinet-Kok I Rijksoverheid
  Kabinet-Kok II Rijksoverheid
Other
 Collectie Interviews Wim Kok at the International Institute of Social History

 
 

|-
 

|-
 
 

|-
 

|-

|-
 
 

|-
 
 

|-
 
|-

 
 

|-
 
 

1938 births
2018 deaths
Consumer rights activists
Dutch cooperative organizers
Deputy Prime Ministers of the Netherlands
Dutch agnostics
Dutch corporate directors
Dutch lobbyists
Dutch nonprofit directors
Dutch nonprofit executives
Dutch officials of the European Union
Dutch political activists
Dutch trade union leaders
European Union lobbyists
Knights Grand Cross of the Order of Isabella the Catholic
Knights Grand Cross of the Order of Orange-Nassau
Labour Party (Netherlands) politicians
Leaders of the Labour Party (Netherlands)
Members of the House of Representatives (Netherlands)
Members of the Social and Economic Council
Ministers of Finance of the Netherlands
Ministers of State (Netherlands)
Nyenrode Business University alumni
People from Bergambacht
Prime Ministers of the Netherlands
Presidents of the European Council
Shell plc people
Royal Netherlands Army personnel
Workers' rights activists
20th-century Dutch military personnel
20th-century Dutch politicians
21st-century Dutch businesspeople
21st-century Dutch politicians
Trade unionists from Amsterdam